The Western Australian Open, also known as the WA Open, is a golf tournament on the PGA Tour of Australasia. It had been a tour event every year since 2009 with the exception of 2019.

History
The first Western Australian Amateur Championship was held in 1911. This consisted of a 36-hole stroke-play qualification stage, played in a single day, followed by match-play to determine the champion. The leading four players in the stroke-play qualified in 1911, increasing to 8 in 1912. In 1913 the stroke-play stage was opened up to professionals, becoming the first Western Australian Open Championship. It was played at the Fremantle links on 28 August, nearly 30 players competing. In both 1911 and 1912, Norman Fowlie had led the stroke-play stage but in 1913 he was challenged by Clyde Pearce, who had won both the Australian Open and Australian Amateur in 1908, as well as losing the final three times in the amateur. Pearce won the Open with rounds of 77 and 78, three ahead of Fowlie who had rounds of 83 and 75. P. C. Anderson came third. The leading professional, David Dakers, came seventh. Pearce would go on to win the amateur championship as well.

The 1914 championship was again played on the Fremantle links in late August. Norman Fowlie reversed the 1913 result, winning by three strokes from Clyde Pearce, with rounds of 80 and 77. Two professionals entered but were well down the field.

Although the state amateur championship resumed in 1919, it was until not 1921 that the open championship was played again. Reg Forbes won with a score of 160. Three players tied for second place on 161, Arthur Geere, Percy Maunder and John Walker. Maunder won a prize of 5 guineas as leading professional, although a £10 prize was available for a professional winner. 1922 saw the first professional winner, Maunder's score of 161 beating Geere by a stroke. Maunder took the £10 first prize.

Winners

Source:

Notes

References

External links
Coverage on the PGA Tour of Australasia's official site
List of winners

Former PGA Tour of Australasia events
Golf tournaments in Australia
Golf in Western Australia

it:Western Australian Open